Golebatovo is a rural locality (a village) in Tolshmenskoye Rural Settlement, Totemsky  District, Vologda Oblast, Russia. The population was 12 as of 2002. There are 4 streets.

Geography 
Golebatovo is located 95 km south of Totma (the district's administrative centre) by road. Uspenye is the nearest rural locality.

References 

Rural localities in Tarnogsky District